Senator Nisar Ahmad Khuhro is a Pakistani Sindhi politician who has been the member of the Senate of Pakistan since March 2022. He is also the President of Pakistan Peoples Party's Sindh chapter.

Early life and family
Khuhro was born on 22 September 1950 in Larkana, Sindh, Pakistan. He got his primary education from Pilot Secondary School in Larkana and passed his Intermediate from DJ collage in Karachi. He has done his graduation from Karachi University and received his vocational education in Frankfurt, Germany.

His daughter Nida Khuhro is also a member of  the Provincial Assembly of Sindh.

Political career
Khuhro is the Provincial President of Pakistan Peoples Party's Sindh chapter since October 2016.

He also served as the Advisor of Chief Minister of Sindh on Works and Services and also on Universities and Boards with the status of a Provincial Minister from August 2019 to August 2021 holding additional charge of the Pro-Chancellor of all public universities in Sindh.

He has served as the Senior Minister of Sindh on Education and Provincial Minister of Sindh on Parliamentary Affairs and Food from 2013 to 2016 and 2016 till 2018.

Khuhro was the Speaker of the Provincial Assembly of Sindh from 2008 till 2013.

He was the Leader of Opposition in the Provincial Assembly of Sindh twice from 1997 till 1999 and again from 2002 till 2007.

Nisar was the Provincial Minister of Sindh for Planning and Development from 1993 to 1996.

From 1990 till 1993 he was the Deputy Leader of the Opposition in Provincial Assembly of Sindh, serving as deputy of Syed Qaim Ali Shah who was the Leader of Opposition Sindh at that time.

Nisar remained a Member of the Provincial Assembly of Sindh continuously from 1988 till 2018 representing Larkana.

In 2016, he moved the Sindh Hindu Marriage Bill which was later passed to become the first Hindu marriage act in Pakistan.

On 9 March 2022, Nisar Khuhro was elected as a member of the Senate of Pakistan on the seat vacated by former PTI senator Faisal Vawda.

References

Speakers of the Provincial Assembly of Sindh
Living people
People from Larkana District
Pakistani Senators 2021–2027
Sindh MPAs 2013–2018
Sindh MPAs 2008–2013
Sindh MPAs 2002–2007
Sindh MPAs 1997–1999
Sindh MPAs 1993–1996
Sindh MPAs 1990–1993
Sindh MPAs 1988–1990
Leaders of the Opposition in the Provincial Assembly of Sindh
1950 births